The final of the Women's Discus Throw event at the 2003 Pan American Games took place on Tuesday August 5, 2003. Defending champion Aretha Hill of the United States once again claimed the title.

Medalists

Records

Results

See also
2003 World Championships in Athletics – Women's discus throw
Athletics at the 2004 Summer Olympics – Women's discus throw

References
Results

Discus, Women
2003
2003 in women's athletics